The Counter Intelligence Corps (Army CIC) was a World War II and early Cold War intelligence agency within the United States Army consisting of highly trained special agents. Its role was taken over by the U.S. Army Intelligence Corps in 1961 and, in 1967, by the United States Army Intelligence Agency. Its functions are now performed by its modern-day descendant organization; United States Army Counterintelligence. The National Counter Intelligence Corps Association (NCICA), a veterans' association, was established in the years immediately following World War II by Military Intelligence agents who had served in every area of military and domestic operations. The organization meets annually. Its newsletter, the Golden Sphinx, is published quarterly.

Origins
The CIC had its origins in the Corps of Intelligence Police founded by Ralph Van Deman in 1917. This organization, operating within the USA and on attachment to the American Expeditionary Force in France, at its peak numbered over 600 men. However, in the post-war period, the policy of isolationism, retrenchment of military spending and economic depression meant that by the mid-1930s its numbers had fallen to fewer than 20 personnel.

World War II
The looming threat of war in the late 1930s brought an expansion of the CIP back to its World War I levels, and the entry of the United States into World War II in December 1941 brought an even greater expansion, and a new name. On 13 December 1941 the Adjutant General of the Army issued an order renaming the CIP as the Counter Intelligence Corps, effective from 1 January 1942. A new complement of 543 officers and 4,431 non-commissioned agents was authorized. The CIC recruited men with legal, police or other investigative backgrounds, and particularly looked for men with foreign language skills. Special CIC teams were created during World War II in Europe, in large part from the Military Intelligence Service personnel (see Ritchie Boys). However, there were never enough of these and local interpreters were often recruited.

As most CIC agents in the field (as well as Military Intelligence Service in Europe) held only non-commissioned officer rank— corporals and various grades of sergeant— they wore either plain clothes, or uniforms without badges of rank; in place of rank insignia, and so as not to be perceived as privates, agents typically wore officer "U.S." collar insignia. They were instructed to identify themselves only as "Agent" or "Special Agent" as appropriate, in order to facilitate their work. These practices continue among modern counterintelligence agents.

Within the U.S. the CIC, in collaboration with the Provost Marshal General and the Federal Bureau of Investigation (FBI), carried out background checks on military personnel having access to classified material, investigations of possible sabotage and subversion, and allegations of disloyalty, especially those directed against Americans of Japanese, Italian or German ancestry.
Despite the prohibitions in the delimitation agreement with the FBI, the CIC ended up devoting considerable effort to civilian investigations. As Volume 7 of The History of the Counter Intelligence Corps explains:
"Espionage and sabotage, being enemy directed, involved more than one person. Usually there were a number in the chain extending from the agent in the United States back through cutouts and couriers to the enemy country. This inevitably involved civilians with military suspects and the case became connected with the FBI. The military aspect became minor, and major investigative effort was in the civilian community to locate the higher-ups who presumably were controlling more than one agent."

However the use of informants within the Army became politically controversial, and CIC was forced to curtail its activities. In particular, the CIC was ordered to cease its domestic investigations, to destroy its investigative records, and to ship its agents out to overseas theaters. The reason for this sudden and unprecedented expulsion has never been clarified. One leading theory was expressed in the official history of the Corps, "the speed [of these events] left little doubt that someone—possibly Communists who still held key positions in government—was determined to halt CIC investigative activities in the United States". Another possible explanation is that the CIC mistakenly bugged the hotel room of Eleanor Roosevelt and incurred the President’s wrath. In any event, the CIC protected the investigative records it had so painstakingly accumulated. According to Sayer and Botting (p. 47) "When the command was given to cease any investigations of known or suspected Communists and destroy all files on such persons immediately, eight of the nine Corps Area Commanders took the remarkable step of disobeying this order". According to the official history of the Corps, this information proved highly valuable in controlling communism: "the information acquired by CIC from May 1941 to September 1945 regarding communism and its adherents played a major part in keeping communism under control in the United States ever since".

Manhattan Project 
CIC units were also involved in providing security for the Manhattan Project, including duty as couriers of fissionable bomb materials from Los Alamos, New Mexico to Tinian. They also operated in 1945 at the United Nations Organizing Conference in San Francisco, over which Alger Hiss presided as secretary-general. Three years later, when Alger Hiss was accused of being a Communist and filed a libel suit against his accuser, his lawyers unwittingly hired an undercover CIC Special Agent as their Chief Investigator to help prepare his libel suit.

In the European and Pacific theaters of operations CIC deployed detachments at all levels. These detachments provided tactical intelligence about the enemy from captured documents, interrogations of captured troops, and from para-military and civilian sources. They were also involved in providing security for military installations and staging areas, located enemy agents, and acted to counter stay-behind networks. They also provided training to combat units in security, censorship, the seizure of documents, and the dangers of booby traps. In some cases CIC agents such as Henry Kissinger found themselves acting as the de facto military government on the occupation of large towns before the arrival of Allied Military Government for Occupied Territories (AMGOT) officers. As the war in Europe came to a close, CIC were involved in the Operations Alsos, Paperclip and TICOM, searching for German personnel and research in atomic weapons, rockets and cryptography. Recruits after World War II included Klaus Barbie, also known as the 'Butcher from Lyon', a former Gestapo member and war criminal.

Post-war operations

Operation Paperclip

At the end of World War II CIC agents were successful in an operation called “Paper Clip” that obtained German rocket scientists for America before the Soviets took them. This action aided in the success of the American rocket development program and resultant adventure into space. CIC actively continued counterintelligence activities in the Cold War, Korean War and Vietnam War.

Other activities

In the immediate post-war period, the CIC operated in the occupied countries, particularly Japan, Germany and Austria, countering the black market, and searching for and arresting notable members of the previous regime. Despite the problem of demobilization, with many experienced agents returning to civilian life, CIC became the leading intelligence organization in the American occupation zones, and very soon found themselves facing a new enemy in the emerging Cold War.

The outbreak of the Korean War in June 1950 meant that CIC was once again involved in a military conflict, and it underwent a major expansion. However this proved to be CIC's last chance to enjoy resources and recruits.

The proliferation of intelligence agencies had meant duplication of effort and disputes over responsibility, so in 1961 the CIC ceased to exist as an independent organization, as it was rolled into the Army's new Military Intelligence Branch.

While serving in the U.S. Army in the 1960s, Christopher H. Pyle learned that "Army intelligence had 1500 plain clothes agents watching every demonstration of 20 people or more throughout the United States". Pyle’s disclosures led to Congressional investigations and a crackdown on what was regarded as the Army’s investigative excesses. This ended what advocates regarded as the peak of counterintelligence efficiency: "At the height of the disturbance period, a CIC agent could get a report from the street to Fort Holabird HQ in 20 minutes, from practically any city in the U.S., seconds or brief minutes later the report was in Operations Center in a lower basement of the Pentagon".

The "ratline" controversy

One of CIC's operations in post-war Europe was the operation of a "rat-line" – a conduit for spiriting informants and defectors out of the Soviet Zones of Occupation to safety in South America, via Italy, with false identities paid for by CIC. However, in 1983 the arrest of former SS officer Klaus Barbie in Bolivia raised questions as to how the "Butcher of Lyon" had escaped. It was then revealed that Barbie had worked for CIC from 1947, and in 1951 had been provided with the means of escape in return for his services as an agent and informant.

A Department of Justice investigation also uncovered the CIC's dealings with Father Krunoslav Draganović, a Croatian cleric based in Rome, who while working for CIC, also operated his own clandestine rat-line to transport Ustaše war criminals to Latin America. 

A further report in 1988 also examined the CIC's use of Nazi war criminals and collaborators as informants in the years after World War II. In June 1988, Office of Special Investigations within the Criminal Division of the Department of Justice issued a public report which revealed that "at least 14 suspected Nazi war criminals, a number of whom likely were involved in the murder of Jews in occupied Europe, had been employed as intelligence informants by the CIC in Austria."

Notable CIC agents

Leroy Anderson, composer 
Donald L. Barlett, journalist
Noel Behn, writer and theatrical producer
Willy Brandt, later German chancellor
John F. Collins, Mayor of Boston
Miles Copeland Jr., musician
Philip J. Corso, Lieutenant Colonel at Roswell, New Mexico
J. Griffin Crump, editor, The Journal of Intergroup Relations
William E. Dannemeyer, California congressman
Foxtrot, Art Dealer
Mike Gravel, Alaska senator
Bill Hartman, athlete
Anthony Hecht, poet
Clint Hill. former United States Secret Service Agent
Henry Kissinger, Secretary of State
Arthur Komori, District Court judge, Military Intelligence Hall of Fame inductee.
Morton Kondracke, journalist
Robie Macauley, editor and novelist 
John J. McFall, California congressman
William A. McNeill, DET 430th CIC
Ib Melchior, film producer 
George J. Mitchell, Maine senator
Tom Moody, Mayor of Columbus, Ohio
William Hughes Mulligan, Federal judge
Walter Pincus, journalist
Cruz Reynoso, lawyer and jurist
Richard Sakakida, USAF Lt Col after war, Military Intelligence Hall of Fame inductee.
J. D. Salinger, novelist
Jerry Seltzer, roller derby promoter
Richard A. Snyder, Pennsylvania State Senator
Bob Shamansky, Ohio congressman
Michel Thomas, Linguist, Language Teacher
William Lewis Uanna, Security Expert
Dr. Donald Lunde, psychiatrist of Ed Kemper and Patty Hearst

See also
 Corps of Intelligence Police
 Klaus Barbie
 The History of the Counter Intelligence Corps
 United States Army Counterintelligence

Footnotes

Sources
CIC Records: A Valuable Tool for Researchers (scroll down)
Counter Intelligence Corps History and Mission in World War II (PDF)

Further reading
 Edwards, Duval A. Spy Catchers of the U.S. Army in the War with Japan (The Unfinished Story of the Counterintelligence Corps). Red Apple Publishing, 1994. 
 Gilbert, James L., John P. Finnegan and Ann Bray. In the Shadow of the Sphynx: A History of Army Counterintelligence, History Office, Office of Strategic Management and Information, US Army Intelligence and Security Command, Fort Belvoir, Virginia, Dec 2005.  (This file might take time to load.)
 Jensen, Joan M.  Army Surveillance in America: 1775–1980. Yale University Press. 1991. .
 Koudelka, Edward R. Counter Intelligence: The Conflict and the Conquest: Recollections of a World War II Agent in Europe. Ranger Associates, 1986. 
 Melchior, Ib. Case by Case: A U.S. Army Counterintelligence Agent in World War II. Presidio, 1993. 
  (Published as part 11 of Covert Warfare: Intelligence, Counterintelligence and Military Deception During the World War II Era)
 Milano, James V., and Patrick Brogan. Soldiers, Spies, and the Rat Line: America's Undeclared War Against the Soviets. Potomac Books (2000) 
 Myers, Larry, Hey Nazis, I'm Coming For You: Memories of Counter Intelligence Corps Activities in WWII. Gainsway Press (2004).  
 Sayer, Ian, and Douglas Botting. America's Secret Army: The Untold Story of the Counter Intelligence Corps. Grafton Books, 1989. 
 Schwartzwalder, John, We Caught Spies: Adventures of an American Counter Intelligence Agent in Europe, Duell, Sloan and Pearce (1946).
 Selby, Scott Andrew. The Axmann Conspiracy: The Nazi Plan for a Fourth Reich and How the U.S. Army Defeated It. Berkley (Penguin), Sept. 2012. 
 Vaughn, Bradley, Counterspy Mission in World War II: Recollections and Impressions of a United States Army Counter Intelligence Corps Special Agent, Professional Pr (September 1993).

External links
 441st Counterintelligence and Military Intelligence Official History
 National Counterintelligence Center – CIC in WWII

Branches of the United States Army
Defunct United States intelligence agencies
Counterintelligence agencies
Military intelligence agencies